Min Junlin (born 19 January 1994 in Leshan), former name Min Quanxin (Chinese: 闵泉鑫;), is a Chinese football player who currently plays for Chengdu Rongcheng.

Club career
Min joined Chinese Super League side Guangzhou R&F in the summer of 2014 season. He made his senior debut on 10 February 2015, in the preliminary round 2 of 2015 AFC Champions League qualifying play-off against Warriors FC, coming on as a substitute for Jiang Ning. In August 2016, he was loaned to Hong Kong Premier League side R&F, which was the satellite team of Guangzhou R&F. He made his debut on 18 September 2016 in the 2016–17 Hong Kong Senior Challenge Shield against BC Glory Sky. 

On 24 February 2017, Min was loaned to Super League newcomer Guizhou Zhicheng for one season. He made his debut for Guizhou on 3 March 2017 in a 1–1 home draw against Liaoning FC. On 27 May 2017, he scored his first senior goal in a 2–2 home draw against Jiangsu Suning. He scored his second goal of the season on 22 July 2017, in a 4–3 home win against Hebei China Fortune. His third goal came on 13 August 2017 against parent club Guangzhou R&F in a 2–0 win for Guizhou. In the 2017 season, Min played the third highest number of minutes of any under 23 player in the CSL. He made a permanent transfer to Guizhou Hengfeng on 26 February 2018.

On 8 July 2021, Min transferred to another second tier club in Chengdu Rongcheng. He would go on to make his debut on 17 July 2021 in a league game against Liaoning Shenyang Urban that ended in a 6-0 victory. He would be a regular part of the team as the club gained promotion to the top tier at the end of the 2021 league campaign.

Career statistics 
Statistics accurate as of match played 8 January 2023.

References

External links
 

1994 births
Living people
Chinese footballers
People from Leshan
Footballers from Sichuan
Guangzhou City F.C. players
R&F (Hong Kong) players
Guizhou F.C. players
Chinese Super League players
China League One players
Hong Kong Premier League players
Association football forwards